Lindsey Michael Mason (born August 1, 1955) is a former professional American football offensive tackle in the National Football League. He played college football for the Kansas Jayhawks. He was selected by the Oakland Raiders in the 3rd round (82nd overall pick) of the 1978 NFL Draft. He played five seasons for the Oakland Raiders (1978, 1980–1981), the San Francisco 49ers (1982), and the Baltimore Colts (1983).

References

1955 births
Living people
Players of American football from Baltimore
American football offensive tackles
Kansas Jayhawks football players
Oakland Raiders players
San Francisco 49ers players
Baltimore Colts players